Robert James "Rob" Wickham (born 3 May 1972) is a British Anglican bishop. In September 2015 he became the area Bishop of Edmonton; he has also served part-time as Acting Bishop of Portsmouth. In February 2023 he was appointed the CEO of the Church Urban Fund from June 2023.

Early life and education
Wickham was born on 3 May 1972. He was educated at Hampton School, an all-boys private school in Hampton, London. After a gap year, he studied geography at Grey College, Durham. He graduated from the University of Durham with a Bachelor of Arts (BA) degree in 1994. He then spent a year working at St Luke's Church, Wallsend, an Anglo-Catholic church in a deprived area of North Tyneside. In 1995, he entered Ridley Hall, Cambridge, a Church of England theological college, where he spent three years studying for ordination to the priesthood.

During his ordained ministry, he undertook post-graduate study. In 2012, he completed a Master of Arts (MA) degree in theology, politics and faith-based organisations at King's College London.

Ordained ministry
Wickham was ordained in the Church of England as a deacon in 1998 and as a priest in 1999. From 1998 to 2001, he continued his training for ministry as a curate at St Mary's Church, Willesden in the Diocese of London; the church contains the Anglican Shrine of Our Lady of Willesden. In 2001, he moved to St Mary's Church, Somers Town where he served as a curate for the next two years. In 2003, he became the Team Vicar in the newly created Parish of Old St Pancras which includes St Pancras Old Church. In 2007, he moved parishes and became Rector of the Church of St John-at-Hackney; this made him the 45th Rector of Hackney. In 2014, he was additionally appointed the Area Dean of Hackney.

Episcopal ministry
In July 2015, Wickham was announced as the next Bishop of Edmonton, an area bishop in the Diocese of London. On 23 September 2015, he was consecrated a bishop in Canterbury Cathedral by Justin Welby, the Archbishop of Canterbury.

It was announced on 26 February 2021 that Wickham is to additionally serve part-time as Acting Bishop of Portsmouth (archbishop's commissary) during the vacancy of that See, starting 28 April 2021. On 18 January 2022, the new Bishop of Portsmouth, Jonathan Frost, took up the See. On 21 February 2023, it was announced that Wickham is to become CEO of Church Urban Fund, resigning his See at the end of June 2023.

Personal life
Wickham is married to Helen, a primary school teacher. Together, they have three children. He is a supporter of Plymouth Argyle football club.

References

1972 births
Living people
People educated at Hampton School
Alumni of Grey College, Durham
Alumni of King's College London
Bishops of Edmonton (London)
21st-century Church of England bishops
Anglo-Catholic bishops
English Anglo-Catholics